Barry John Corr (born 13 January 1981) is a Scottish former footballer who played as a goalkeeper.

Football career
Corr began his senior career with Scottish Premier League club Celtic. He made his first and only appearance for the club when he came on as a substitute for Jonathan Gould against Hearts in April 1999. From there he moved onto another SPL side, Motherwell, after a loan spell with amateur side Queens Park. After his time in Lanarkshire, Corr moved into the Scottish Football League playing for Stranraer, Queen of the South and Ayr United.

After leaving Ayr United, Corr joined Junior side Clydebank before retiring.

References

External links

Scottish footballers
1981 births
Footballers from Glasgow
Living people
Ayr United F.C. players
Stranraer F.C. players
Celtic F.C. players
Motherwell F.C. players
Queen of the South F.C. players
Scottish Premier League players
Scottish Football League players
Association football goalkeepers
Scottish Junior Football Association players
Clydebank F.C. players
Yoker Athletic F.C. players
East Stirlingshire F.C. players
Queen's Park F.C. players